The 43rd Annual Martín Fierro Awards, presented by APTRA, was held on August 5, 2013. During the ceremony, APTRA gave the Martín Fierro Awards for 2012 works.

Awards

Television
Winners are listed first and highlighted in boldface.

2012 in Argentine television
2013 in Argentina
2013 television awards
Argentina culture-related lists